Pachyodes haemataria is a moth of the family Geometridae first described by Gottlieb August Wilhelm Herrich-Schäffer in 1854. It is found in India.

References

Moths described in 1854
Pseudoterpnini
Moths of Asia